The North Eastern League was an association football league for teams in the North East of England.

The league was founded in 1906 and was initially successful, with teams defecting from the rival Northern Football Alliance to play. Although some members (such as Darlington) transferred to join the Football League Third Division North in 1921, the North Eastern League absorbed the Northern Alliance in 1925–26 and split into two divisions. The league spent nine years like this, returning to one division in 1935; clubs from the second division re-forming the Northern Football Alliance, which became a feeder to it.

As years progressed, numbers dwindled and the league initially folded in 1958 after the withdrawal of Football League clubs' reserve sides. The remaining members initially transferred to the Midland Football League before founding the Northern Counties League in 1960. The Northern Counties League was renamed the North Eastern League in 1962–63 but folded for a second time in 1964.

Champions
The champions of the league were as follows:

1906–07 : Newcastle United Reserves
1907–08 : Newcastle United Reserves
1908–09 : Newcastle United Reserves
1909–10 : Spennymoor United
1910–11 : Newcastle United Reserves
1911–12 : Middlesbrough Reserves
1912–13 : Darlington
1913–14 : South Shields
1914–15 : South Shields
1915–19 : Not contested due to the First World War
1919–20 : Middlesbrough Reserves
1920–21 : Darlington
1921–22 : Carlisle United
1922–23 : Newcastle United Reserves
1923–24 : South Shields Reserves
1924–25 : Sunderland Reserves
1925–26 : Newcastle United Reserves
1926–27 : Sunderland Reserves
1927–28 : Sunderland Reserves
1928–29 : Sunderland Reserves
1929–30 : Sunderland Reserves
1930–31 : Middlesbrough Reserves
1931–32 : Middlesbrough Reserves
1932–33 : Middlesbrough Reserves
1933–34 : Sunderland Reserves
1934–35 : Middlesbrough Reserves
1935–36 : Blyth Spartans
1936–37 : Sunderland Reserves
1937–38 : Horden Colliery Welfare
1938–39 : South Shields
1939–46 : Not contested due to the Second World War
1945–46 : Spennymoor United
1946–47 : Middlesbrough Reserves
1947–48 : Sunderland Reserves
1948–49 : Middlesbrough Reserves
1949–50 : North Shields
1950–51 : Stockton
1951–52 : Middlesbrough Reserves
1952–53 : Sunderland Reserves
1953–54 : Middlesbrough Reserves
1954–55 : Middlesbrough Reserves
1955–56 : Middlesbrough Reserves
1956–57 : Spennymoor United
1957–58 : South Shields
1960–61 : North Shields (NCL)
1961–62 : Consett (NCL)
1962–63 : Scarborough
1963–64 : Horden Colliery Welfare

Member clubs
During the league's existence, 82 clubs and reserve teams played in the league.

Annfield Plain
Ashington
Ashington Reserves
Bedlington United
Birtley
Blackhall Colliery Welfare
Blyth Spartans
Bradford City 'A'
Bradford City Reserves
Bradford Park Avenue Reserves
Carlisle United
Carlisle United Reserves
Chester-le-Street Town
Chilton Colliery Athletic
Chopwell Institute
Consett
Craghead United
Crawcrook Albion
Crook Town
Darlington
Darlington Reserves
Dipton United
Durham City
Durham City Reserves
Eden Colliery Welfare
Eppleton Colliery Welfare
Felling Colliery
Gateshead
Gateshead Reserves
Gateshead Town
Hartlepools United
Hartlepools United Reserves
Hebburn Argyle
Hexham Town
High Fell
Horden Colliery Welfare
Houghton Rovers
Huddersfield Town
Jarrow
Leadgate Park
Leeds City 'A'
Leeds City Reserves
Mickley
Middlesbrough Reserves
Murton Colliery Welfare
Newbiggin West End
Newburn
Newcastle City
Newcastle East End
Newcastle United Reserves
North Shields
Ouston Rovers
Pegswood United
Penrith
Preston Stanley
Redcar Albion
Scarborough
Scotswood
Seaham Harbour
Seaham White Star
Seaton Delaval
Shildon
South Shields
Spen Black & White
Spennymoor United
St Peters Albion
Stakeford Albion
Stockton
Sunderland Reserves
Sunderland Rovers
Throckley Welfare
Usworth Colliery
Walker Celtic
Wallsend
Washington Colliery
West Stanley
West Wylam Colliery Welfare
White-le-Head Rangers
Whitley Bay Athletic
Wingate Albion
Workington
Workington Reserves

References

 
1908 establishments in England
1964 disestablishments in England
Defunct football leagues in England
Reserve football leagues in England